The 1984 United States Senate elections were held on November 6, with the 33 seats of Class 2 contested in regular elections. They coincided with the landslide re-election of President Ronald Reagan in the presidential election. In spite of the lopsided presidential race, Reagan's Republican Party suffered a net loss of two Senate seats to the Democrats, although it retained control of the Senate with a reduced 53-47 majority. Democrats defeated incumbents in Illinois and Iowa, and won an open seat in Tennessee, while Republicans defeated an incumbent in Kentucky.

Results summary

Source: Office of the Clerk

Gains, losses, and holds

Retirements
Two Republicans and two Democrats retired instead of seeking re-election.

Defeats
Two Republicans and one Democrat sought re-election but lost in the general election.

Change in composition

Before the elections

After the elections

Race summary

Special elections 
There were no special elections to the U.S. Senate in 1984.

Elections leading to the next Congress 
In these general elections, the winners were elected for the term beginning January 3, 1985; ordered by state.

All of the elections involved the Class 2 seats.

Closest races 

In six races the margin of victory was under 10%.

Minnesota was the tipping point state with a margin of victory of 16.8%.

Alabama

Alaska 

Incumbent Republican Ted Stevens sought re-election to a fourth term. Owing to his popularity and the conservative bent of Alaska, Stevens did not face major opposition, and easily defeated former Alaska Attorney General John Havelock in the general election.

Arkansas 

Incumbent Democrat David Pryor won re-election to a second term over Republican U.S. Representative Ed Bethune.

Colorado 

Incumbent Republican William L. Armstrong won re-election to a second term over Democrat Lieutenant Governor of Colorado Nancy E. Dick.

Delaware 

Incumbent Democrat and future President of the United States Joe Biden won re-election to a third term, defeating Republican challenger John M. Burris, former Majority Leader of the Delaware House of Representatives.

Georgia 

Incumbent Democrat Sam Nunn won re-election to a third term over Republican educator, Mike Hicks

Idaho 

Incumbent Republican James A. McClure won re-election to a third term over Democratic Vietnam War veteran, Peter M. Busch.

Illinois 

Incumbent Republican Charles H. Percy ran for re-election to a fourth term in the United States Senate. Senator Percy was opposed by Democratic nominee Paul Simon, who was a United States Congressman from Illinois's 22nd congressional district. The campaign between Percy and Simon was brutal and toughly-fought, and ended up with Simon ousting Percy by fewer than 90,000 votes, which was, at the time, considered an upset.

The election was very close. Simon prevailed by only 89,126 votes, or 1.86%. Incumbent Percy did well all throughout the state, including the Chicago collar counties. However, Simon received huge numbers out of the heavily populated and Democratic Cook County, which encompasses most of the Chicago Metropolitan Area. Percy led early on and well into the night, but as Cook County began to count all of its votes, Simon pulled ahead. Simon won despite then-president Reagan winning the state easily. Percy called Simon at around 5 A.M. the next day and conceded. Percy also congratulated Simon on his hard-earned victory. Simon was sworn in on January 3, 1985, and served in the senate until January 3, 1997, when he retired. Simon was later succeeded by Dick Durbin, a close friend and fellow Democrat.

Iowa 

Incumbent Republican Roger Jepsen ran for re-election to a second term in the United States Senate. Jepsen was opposed by United States Congressman Tom Harkin, from Iowa's 5th congressional district, who won the Democratic primary uncontested. The general election was full of mudslinging and personal attacks, including the embellishment by both candidates of their military records; Harkin attacked Jepsen for failing to keep his promise to not sell AWACS aircraft to Saudi Arabia. Ultimately, Harkin defeated Jepsen by a wide margin, winning the first of five terms in the Senate.

Kansas 

Incumbent Republican Nancy Kassebaum won re-election to a second term over Democrat James R. Maher, a financial consultant.

Kentucky 

Incumbent Democrat Walter Huddleston ran for re-election to a third term, but lost by less than 0.5% to Jefferson County Executive Mitch McConnell.

Huddleston was unopposed in the Democratic Party's primary.

Louisiana 

Incumbent Democratic J. Bennett Johnston won unopposed to a third term.

Maine 

Incumbent Republican William Cohen won re-election to a second term over Democrat Libby Mitchell, State Representative.

Massachusetts 

The election was won by Democrat John Kerry, the Lieutenant Governor of Massachusetts who remained Senator until 2013 when he resigned to become U.S. Secretary of State. One-term incumbent Paul Tsongas declined to seek re-election and retired from the Senate following a battle with cancer.

Michigan 

Incumbent Democrat Carl Levin won re-election to a second term.

Minnesota 

Incumbent Republican Rudy Boschwitz defeated Democratic challenger Joan Growe, Minnesota Secretary of State.

Mississippi 

Incumbent Republican Thad Cochran won re-election to a second term over former Democratic Governor William Winter.

Montana 

Incumbent Max Baucus ran for re-election. He easily won renomination in the Democratic primary, and advanced to the general election, where he faced Chuck Cozzens, a former State Representative and the Republican nominee. Despite President Ronald Reagan's strong performance in the state that year, Baucus was able to easily win a second term over Cozzens.

Nebraska 

Incumbent Democrat J. James Exon won re-election to a second term over Republican businesswoman Nancy Hoch.

New Hampshire 

Incumbent Republican Gordon J. Humphrey won re-election to a second term over Democratic U.S. Representative Norman D'Amours.

New Jersey 

Incumbent Democrat Bill Bradley ran for re-election to a second term, defeating Republican Mayor of Montclair Mary V. Mochary.

New Mexico 

Incumbent Republican Pete Domenici ran for re-election to a third term, defeating Democrat Judith Pratt.

North Carolina 

The election was fought between the Republican incumbent Jesse Helms and Democratic Governor Jim Hunt. Helms won the election, the most expensive non-presidential election in United States history up to that point, by a margin significantly reduced from that that Helms achieved in 1978.

Hunt had a commanding lead in opinion polls for much of the campaign, with one poll in 1983 putting him nineteen points clear of Helms. However, that was changed by the most bitterly contested election in the country that year. Hunt ran a campaign ad connecting Helms to death squads in El Salvador through his association with the Nationalist Republican Alliance, for whom Roberto d'Aubuisson had recently run for the President of El Salvador. In the short time before election day, however, the highly popular incumbent US President Ronald Reagan gave Helms a significant boost by campaigning for him and running a local TV ad praising Helms and asking registered voters in North Carolina to re-elect him.

The election cost a total of $26,379,483 in total reported spending (over twelve times as much as the 1980 race), of which, 64% ($16.9m) was spent by Helms.

Voters Education Project (VEP) in Atlanta study showed that Helms received 63 percent of the white vote and was particularly successful in small towns and rural areas, while receiving less than 1 percent of the black vote in 35 almost-all-black precincts. "Hunt got 37 percent of the white and 98.8 percent of the black vote, according to VEP. But only 61 percent of registered blacks voted, down from 63 percent in 1980." While, It had among the lowest industrial wages in the United States and was third in terms of mobile homes.

Oklahoma 
Incumbent Democrat David Boren won re-election to a second term.

Oregon 

Incumbent Republican Mark Hatfield sought re-election, defeating Democrat State Senator Margie Hendricksen.

Rhode Island 

Incumbent Democrat Claiborne Pell sought re-election, defeating Republican Barbara M. Leonard.

South Carolina 
{{Infobox election
| election_name     = South Carolina election
| country           = South Carolina
| type              = presidential
| ongoing           = no
| previous_election = 1978 United States Senate election in South Carolina
| previous_year     = 1978
| next_election     = 1990 United States Senate election in South Carolina
| next_year         = 1990
| image_size        = 125x136px
| image1            = Strom Thurmond.jpg
| nominee1          = Strom Thurmond
| party1            = Republican Party (US)
| popular_vote1     = 644,814
| percentage1       = 66.8%| image2            = No image.svg
| nominee2          = Melvin Purvis
| party2            = Democratic Party (US)
| popular_vote2     = 306,982
| percentage2       = 31.8%
| map_image         = 1984 United States Senate election in South Carolina results map by county.svg
| map_size          = 220px
| map_caption       = County results
| title             = U.S. Senator
| before_election   = Strom Thurmond
| before_party      = Republican Party (US)
| after_election    = Strom Thurmond
| after_party       = Republican Party (US)
}}

Popular incumbent Republican Strom Thurmond cruised to re-election against Democratic challenger Melvin Purvis. Melvin Purvis, a white minister and the son of famous FBI agent Melvin Purvis, won a close race against black photographer Cecil J. Williams. The closeness of the race and the fact that the black candidate did not win propelled Jesse Jackson to request a Justice Department investigation into the primary and he also considered an independent bid for the seat.  Governor Richard Riley and 3rd district Representative Butler Derrick flirted with running, but backed down when Thurmond received endorsements from prominent Democrats in South Carolina.

Senator Strom Thurmond easily defeated Robert Cunningham to advance to the general election.

Thurmond received endorsements from former Democratic governor Robert Evander McNair, Charleston mayor Joseph P. Riley Jr., and an assortment of black mayors in the state. He did not face a serious challenge and spent almost $1.5 million on the race whereas Purvis spent less than $10,000. An ironic footnote to the election is the fact that Purvis used Thurmond's age as an issue in the campaign. He claimed Thurmond was too old, yet Purvis died less than two years after the election of a heart attack at age 46.

|-
| 
| colspan=5 |Republican hold'''
|-

South Dakota 

Incumbent Republican Larry Pressler won re-election for a second term, defeating Democrat George V. Cunningham.

Tennessee 

Three-term popular incumbent Howard Baker, who had served as United States Senate Majority Leader since 1981 (Minority Leader from 1977 to 1981) decided not to seek re-election in order to concentrate on a planned bid for 1988 Republican presidential nomination (which did not happen, as he later accepted a White House Chief of Staff position under President Ronald Reagan). This made a seat open.

Democrats nominated Representative and future Vice President of the United States Al Gore, whose father Albert Gore, Sr. once held the other Tennessee Senate seat.

In the Republican primary, held on August 2, Ashe easily emerged as a winner:

 Ashe - 145,744 (86.47%)
 McNeil - 17,970 (10.66%)
 Patty - 4,777 (2.83%)
 Write-in - 49 (0.03%)

Although the Senate election coincided with the landslide re-election of President Reagan, who carried Tennessee by a wide margin, this time his victory did not have any coattails, as it did in 1980, and Democrats picked up three Republican seats. One of the Democratic gains was in Tennessee, where conservative democrat Gore won in a landslide:

Texas 

Incumbent Republican John G. Tower decided to retire, instead of seeking a fifth term. Republican Phil Gramm won the open seat over Democratic State Senator Lloyd Doggett.

The Democratic primary was 45% Hispanic, but included many moderate to conservative voters. Hance positioned himself as the most moderate to conservative candidate, who co-sponsored President Ronald Reagan's tax package. Doggett was the more liberal candidate, attacking Reaganomics and getting endorsements from the Texas teachers' union and Agriculture Commissioner Jim Hightower. Krueger was seen as the front runner and was a moderate who supported the state's oil and gas industry, but had close ties with the Hispanic community because he was Spanish-speaking. Hance attacked both Kroeger and Doggett for supporting amnesty for illegal aliens and supporting gay rights.
The initial primary was extremely close between the top three candidates. Each candidate got 31% of the electorate. Hance ranked first, only 273 votes ahead of Doggett and 1,560 votes ahead of Krueger.

Since no candidate passed the 50% threshold, Hance and Doggett qualified for the run-off election. Hance fired his pollster despite ranking first. Krueger endorsed fellow U.S. Congressman Hance, saying "Ultimately, the quality of one's public service depends upon the character that one displays in filling an office." In the June election, Doggett very narrowly defeated Hance by just 1,345 votes.

Initial election on May 5, 1984

Run-off election on June 2, 1984

The Republican primary was a highly competitive, multimillion-dollar contest. Gramm recently switched parties in 1983, but he was a conservative who supported Reaganomics. Gramm spent $4 million.

Virginia 

Incumbent Republican John W. Warner won re-election to a second term. He handily defeated Edythe C. Harrison, member of the Virginia House of Delegates the "first woman in Virginia nominated by the Democratic Party for statewide office."

West Virginia 

Incumbent Democratic Jennings Randolph decided to retire, instead of seeking a fifth term. Democrat Jay Rockefeller won the open seat over Republican John Raese.

Wyoming 

Incumbent Republican Alan K. Simpson has won re-election for a second term, defeating Democrat Victor A. Ryan.

See also

 1984 United States elections
 1984 United States gubernatorial elections
 1984 United States presidential election
 1984 United States House of Representatives elections
 98th United States Congress
 99th United States Congress

References

Sources